Laishram Devi may refer to:

 Bombayla Devi Laishram, Indian archer
 Laishram Monika Devi, Indian weightlifter
 Laishram Sarita Devi, Indian boxer